USS Resolute may refer to the following ships operated by the United States Navy:

 , a steamer in commission from 1861 to 1865
 , an auxiliary cruiser and transport in commission from 1898 to 1899
 , a tug in commission from 1918 to 1919
 , a tug in commission in 1919
 , a motorboat placed in commission as a ship's tender in 1918
 USS Resolute (YT-458), a tug in commission from May 1943 to November 1944 which was renamed  in June 1943
 , a medium auxiliary floating drydock
 HSV Resolute (JHSV-5), a joint high speed vessel completed in 2015 as 

United States Navy ship names